Estrin is a surname, and may refer to:

 Allen Estrin (born 1954), American screenwriter and co-founder of PragerU.
 Dan Estrin (born 1976), guitarist
 Deborah Estrin, Professor of Computer Science, University of California Los Angeles
 Gerald Estrin (1921-2012), Professor Emeritus of Computer Science, University of California Los Angeles
 Judith Estrin, American business executive
 Marc Estrin (born 1939) American writer and political activist
 Morton Estrin (born 1923), American pianist
 Robert Estrin (born 1942), American film editor
 Thelma Estrin (1924-2014), American computer scientist and biomedical engineer
 Yakov Estrin (1923–1987), Russian chess player

It may also refer to:

 Estrin, a parent structure of the estrogen steroid hormones